Zungaropsis is a genus of catfish (order Siluriformes) of the family Pimelodidae. It is a monotypic genus,  containing only the single species Zungaropsis multimaculatus , and is considered closely related to Zungaro. In 2003, Zungaropsis was considered as a genus inquirendum of the Pimelodidae.

This species is endemic to Brazil where it occurs in the Xingu River.

References

Pimelodidae
Monotypic fish genera
Catfish of South America
Freshwater fish of Brazil
Endemic fauna of Brazil
Fish described in 1908
Taxa named by Franz Steindachner